Amadou Tidiane Dia (born June 8, 1993) is an American professional soccer player who plays as a left-back for Louisville City in the USL Championship.

Career

College and amateur
Dia spent all four years of his college career at Clemson University where he made a total of 70 appearances for the Tigers and tallied four goals and four assists.

He also spent two seasons in the Premier Development League for Real Colorado Foxes.

Professional
Dia was drafted 20th overall in the 2015 MLS SuperDraft by Sporting Kansas City. He made his professional debut on March 8 against the New York Red Bulls. In July 2016, Dia was traded by Sporting Kansas City to the Montreal Impact in exchange for forward Cameron Porter. His option was declined following the 2016 season. Dia then signed with Phoenix Rising FC on June 9, 2017.

Dia returned to Sporting Kansas City in January 2020. Following the 2021 season, Dia's contract option was declined by Kansas City.

On January 14, 2022, DIa joined USL Championship club Louisville City.

Personal
Dia holds both American and French citizenship.

References

External links

Clemson Tigers bio
USSF Development Academy bio

1993 births
Living people
American people of Senegalese descent
American sportspeople of African descent
Sportspeople of Senegalese descent
American soccer players
Association football defenders
Clemson Tigers men's soccer players
Footballers from Nantes
French emigrants to the United States
French footballers
French sportspeople of Senegalese descent
Louisville City FC players
Major League Soccer players
CF Montréal players
People from Highlands Ranch, Colorado
Phoenix Rising FC players
Real Colorado Foxes players
Soccer players from Colorado
Sporting Kansas City draft picks
Sporting Kansas City players
Sportspeople from the Denver metropolitan area
Sporting Kansas City II players
United States men's youth international soccer players
USL Championship players
USL League Two players